Big Clifty is an unincorporated community and census-designated place (CDP) in Grayson County, Kentucky, United States.

History 
Clifty Creek crosses U.S. Highway 62 and the P & L railroad several miles to the southwest of Big Clifty. It is said that travelers named the town due to the limestone cliffs that arose on the sides of Clifty Creek.

Demographics

References

Census-designated places in Grayson County, Kentucky
Census-designated places in Kentucky